The orthographic depth of an alphabetic orthography indicates the degree to which a written language deviates from simple one-to-one letter–phoneme correspondence. It depends on how easy it is to predict the pronunciation of a word based on its spelling: shallow orthographies are easy to pronounce based on the written word, and deep orthographies are difficult to pronounce based on how they are written.

In shallow orthographies, the spelling-sound correspondence is direct: from the rules of pronunciation, one is able to pronounce the word correctly. In other words, shallow (transparent) orthographies, also called phonemic orthographies, have a one-to-one relationship between its graphemes and phonemes, and the spelling of words is very consistent. Such examples include Hindi, Spanish, Finnish, Turkish, Latin and Italian.

In contrast, in deep (opaque) orthographies, the relationship is less direct, and the reader must learn the arbitrary or unusual pronunciations of irregular words. In other words, deep orthographies are writing systems that do not have a one-to-one correspondence between sounds (phonemes) and the letters (graphemes) that represent them. They may reflect etymology (English, Faroese, Mongolian script, Thai, French, or Franco-Provençal) or be morphophonemic (Korean or Russian).

Written Korean represents an unusual hybrid; each phoneme in the language is represented by a letter but the letters are packaged into "square" units of two to four phonemes, each square representing a syllable. Korean has very complex phonological variation rules, especially regarding the consonants rather than the vowels, in contrast to English. Among the consonants of the Korean language, only one is always pronounced exactly as it is written.

Italian offers clear examples of differential directionality in depth. Even in a very shallow orthographic system, spelling-to-pronunciation and pronunciation-to-spelling may not be equally clear. There are two major imperfect matches of vowels to letters: in stressed syllables, e can represent either open  or closed , and o stands for either open  or closed . According to the orthographic principles used for the language,  'sect', for example, with open  can only be spelled , and  'summit' with closed  can only be  — if a listener can hear it, they can spell it. A second lacuna in Italian's shallow orthography is that although stress position in words is only very partially predictable, it is normally not indicated in writing.

Orthographic depth hypothesis
According to the orthographic depth hypothesis, shallow orthographies are more easily able to support a word recognition process that involves the language phonology. In contrast, deep orthographies encourage a reader to process printed words by referring to their morphology via the printed word's visual-orthographic structure (see also Ram Frost). For languages with relatively deep orthographies such as English, French, unvocalised Arabic or Hebrew, new readers have much more difficulty learning to decode words. As a result, children learn to read more slowly. For languages with relatively shallow orthographies, such as Italian and Finnish, new readers have few problems learning to decode words. As a result, children learn to read relatively quickly.

The phonetic writing systems of Japanese (hiragana and katakana) are another example of shallow orthography, but Japanese also uses logographs (kanji), which are significantly more complicated. Additionally, Latinization known as rōmaji is increasingly common but not used traditionally. However, in contrast to alphabetic orthographies (English, French, Italian, Turkish, etc.), the Japanese hiragana and katakana orthographies are based on the open syllables of speech (consonant-vowel) or, more precisely, on the mora, with one written symbol for each of the syllables/moras in the language. While Japanese has only three graphemes for six phonemes like in the word katana (Japanese hiragana: , Japanese katakana:  IPA) Japanese kana is divided into syllables/morae with a simple V or C+V structure (with one -C mora that typically only appears at the ends of syllables), rather than by individual vowels and consonants; fewer graphemes are needed to write a word. Since Japanese phonology is relatively simple compared to many other languages, writing Japanese using syllables rather than alphabetic letters is a feasible option. 

Van den Bosch et al. consider orthographic depth to be the composition of at least two separate components. One of these relates to the complexity of the relations between the elements at the graphemic level (graphemes) to those at the phonemic level (phonemes), i.e., how difficult it is to convert graphemic strings (words) to phonemic strings. The second component is related to the diversity at the graphemic level, and to the complexity of determining the graphemic elements of a word (graphemic parsing), i.e.,  how to align a phonemic transcription to its spelling counterpart.

Xavier Marjou uses an artificial neural network to rank 17 orthographies according to their level of transparency. Among the tested orthographies, Chinese and French orthographies, followed by English and Russian, are the most opaque regarding writing (i.e. phonemes to graphemes direction) and English, followed by Dutch, is the most opaque regarding reading (i.e. graphemes to phonemes direction); Esperanto, Arabic, Finnish, Korean, Serbo-Croatian and Turkish are very shallow both to read and to write; Italian is shallow to read and very shallow to write, Breton, German, Portuguese and Spanish are shallow to read and to write.

See also

 English-language spelling reform

References

Orthography
Phonetics
Phonology
Spelling